Changying Area is an area and Hui ethnic township located on the eastern portion of Chaoyang District, Beijing, China. It borders Dongba and Jinzhan Townships to the north, Yongshun Town to the east, Guanzhuang and Sanjianfang Townships to the south, and Pingfang Township to the west. As of the 2020 Chinese census, Changying was home to 113,891 people.

In 1368, Ming general Chang Yuchun had his trooped stationed here during his conquest of Khanbaliq, and the region was named Changying accordingly.

History

Administrative Divisions 
As of 2021, Changying has direct jurisdiction over 16 residential communities:

See also 
 List of township-level divisions of Beijing

References

Chaoyang District, Beijing
Areas of Beijing
Ethnic townships of the People's Republic of China